"You Owe It All to Me" is a song by Scottish band Texas, released as the second single from their third studio album, Ricks Road (1993). It reached number 39 on the UK Singles Chart in October 1993.

Music video
The music video for the track "You Owe It All to Me" was directed by Dani Jacobs. It was filmed in Arizona and features Sharleen Spiteri and Ally McErlaine filmed in the style of a road movie with the pair encountering another version of themselves along the way.

Track listings
7-inch and cassette single (TEX10; TEXMC 10)
 "You Owe It All to Me"
 "Don't Help Me Through"

CD1 (TEXCD 10)
 "You Owe It All to Me"
 "Don't Help Me Through"
 "Make Me Want to Scream"
 "Strange That I Want You"

CD2 (TEXCL 10)
"You Owe It All to Me"
"I Don't Want a Lover"
"So Called Friend"
"Revolution"
 All tracks were recorded live in Room 530 at the Munich Hilton on 14 September 1993

Charts

References

Texas (band) songs
1993 singles
1993 songs
Songs written by Johnny McElhone
Songs written by Sharleen Spiteri
Vertigo Records singles